Norbert Hofmann (born 14 August 1951) is a German football manager and former player.

Hofmann made 74 appearances in the Bundesliga and a further 238 in the 2. Bundesliga during his playing career.

References

External links 
 

1951 births
Living people
German footballers
Association football midfielders
Association football forwards
Association football utility players
Bundesliga players
2. Bundesliga players
KFC Uerdingen 05 players
German football managers